Enid Dame (June 28, 1943, Beaver Falls, Pennsylvania – December 25, 2003) was an American poet, fiction writer, teacher, editor, and publisher.  For many years, she and her husband, poet Donald Lev, lived in Brooklyn and in High Falls, New York, where they edited and published the literary tabloid Home Planet News. She was on the faculty of the New Jersey Institute of Technology and Rutgers University in New Brunswick, where she served as Associate Director of the Writing Program.

Dame's poems explored themes of urban life, Jewish history and identity, and political activism. She examined contemporary women's lives in persona poems that take on the voice of Eve, Lilith, or other woman from Jewish tradition.  These poems often locate a kernel of feminist rebellion in familiar Biblical stories. The 2007 anthology Broken Land: Poems of Brooklyn, edited by Julia Kasdorf and Michael Tyrell, was dedicated to her memory.

Her works

Riding the D Train
On the Road to Damascus, Maryland
Lilith
Lilith's New Career
Lilith and Her Demons
Dream Wedding
Anything You Don't See

Further reading
Poets on the Psalms featuring Enid Dame. Edited by Lynn Domina (Trinity University Press, 2008).

References

External links
 Honoring Enid Dame at Rutgers
 In Memorial to Enid Dame
  Poets Enid Dame and Donald Lev
  Enid Dame Poems

"Enid Dame's Householdry" by Burt Kimmelman, in Rain Taxi (Summer 2009)

1943 births
2003 deaths
New Jersey Institute of Technology faculty
Rutgers University faculty
American fiction writers
American women poets
20th-century American poets
20th-century American women writers
American women academics
21st-century American women